The 2011–12 Alabama Crimson Tide men's basketball team (variously "Alabama", "UA", "Bama" or "The Tide") represented the University of Alabama in the 2011–12 college basketball season. The team's head coach was Anthony Grant, in his third season at Alabama after posting a 25–12 record the previous year. The team played their home games at Coleman Coliseum in Tuscaloosa, Alabama, as a member of the Southeastern Conference. This was the 99th season of basketball in the school's history. They finished the season 21–12 overall, 9–7 SEC play, and finished in 5th place. They were defeated by Florida in the quarterfinals of the 2012 SEC men's basketball tournament, and they lost to Creighton in the 2012 NCAA Division I men's basketball tournament second round.

Pre-season

The 2010–11 season was the second under head coach Anthony Grant. The Tide finished the season 25–12 (12–4 SEC), winning the Southeastern Conference Western Division, and finishing second in the 2011 National Invitation Tournament. The Crimson Tide had four players graduate and two transfer after the season ended. They also brought in five freshman recruits and one junior college transfer, finishing fifth in Rivals.com team recruiting rankings.

Class of 2011 signees

Roster

Source: Rolltide.com 2011–12 Roster

Depth chart

Suspensions
Following the February 4 victory against Ole Miss, Tony Mitchell, the team's second leading scorer, was suspended indefinitely due to "conduct detrimental to the team." In the next game, Alabama went on the road to defeat Auburn by a record 18 points, but prior to that Saturday's game against LSU Grant suspended 3 more players for a "violation of team rules." This time it was the Crimson Tide's senior leading scorer JaMychal Green, starting PG Trevor Releford and Andrew Steele. With its top three leading scorers out and only one upperclassmen left on the bench, the shorthanded Crimson Tide fell to the LSU Tigers. Releford and Steele returned the following game to face the Florida Gators on February 14, but Green and Mitchell remained suspended. On February 20, Grant announced that Green was returning to practice and Mitchell would remain suspended for the duration of the season. Green did not play in the February 23 game against Arkansas. He finally saw game action again on February 25 at home against Mississippi State.

Schedule and results

|-
!colspan=12 style="background:#990000; color:#FFFFFF;"| Exhibition

|-
!colspan=12 style="background:#990000; color:#FFFFFF;"| Non-conference regular season

|-
!colspan=12 style="background:#990000; color:#FFFFFF;"| SEC Regular Season

|-
!colspan=12 style="background:#990000; color:#FFFFFF;"| 2012 SEC tournament

|-
!colspan=12 style="background:#990000; color:#FFFFFF;"| 2012 NCAA tournament

|-
| colspan="12" | <small>*Non-Conference Game. Rankings from AP poll. All times are in Central Time. (#) Number seeded with region.
|}
Source: 2011–12 Schedule. Rolltide.com

Rankings

See also
Iron Bowl of Basketball
2012 NCAA Division I men's basketball tournament
2011–12 NCAA Division I men's basketball season
2011–12 NCAA Division I men's basketball rankings

References

Alabama
Alabama Crimson Tide men's basketball seasons
Alabama
Alabama Crimson Tide men's basketball
Alabama Crimson Tide men's basketball